Óscar García-Casarrubios Pintor (born 7 June 1984 in Campo de Criptana) is a Spanish former professional racing cyclist.

Major results
2005
 1st Stages 3 and 4 Vuelta a Palencia
 8th Clásica a los Puertos de Guadarrama
2006
 6th Overall Tour of Qinghai Lake
1st  Mountains classification
2008
 1st  Overall Vuelta a Galicia
 1st Stage 1 Volta a Coruña
2010
 1st Stage 1 Vuelta a Venezuela

References

External links

1984 births
Living people
Spanish male cyclists
Sportspeople from the Province of Ciudad Real
Cyclists from Castilla-La Mancha